Michael Joseph Durant (born September 14, 1969) is a retired Major League Baseball catcher. He played during one season at the major league level for the Minnesota Twins. 

A native of Columbus, Ohio, Durant played college baseball for Ohio State. In 1989 and 1990, he played collegiate summer baseball with the Yarmouth–Dennis Red Sox of the Cape Cod Baseball League and was named a league all-star in 1990.

He was drafted by the Twins in the second round of the 1991 MLB Draft. Durant played his first professional season with their Class A Kenosha Twins in 1991, and his last with their Triple-A Salt Lake Buzz in 1997.

References

External links

1969 births
Living people
Minnesota Twins players
Major League Baseball catchers
Visalia Oaks players
Nashville Xpress players
Salt Lake Buzz players
Kenosha Twins players
Baseball players from Columbus, Ohio
Ohio State Buckeyes baseball players
Yarmouth–Dennis Red Sox players